Teleiodes paraluculella is a moth of the family Gelechiidae. It is found in Korea.

The wingspan is about 10 mm. The forewings are greyish, the basal fascia is indistinct and consists of three scale tufts. The first is dark grey and found on the costa, the middle one yellowish and the third is located just before the middle. There is a tiny central yellowish patch with a small scale tuft consisting of yellow and dark grey scales below it. The hindwings are pale grey.

References

Moths described in 1992
Teleiodes